Kundiman is a genre of traditional Filipino love songs. The lyrics of the kundiman are written in Tagalog. The melody is characterized by a smooth, flowing and gentle rhythm with dramatic intervals. Kundiman was the traditional means of serenade in the Philippines.

The kundiman emerged as an art song at the end of the 19th century and by the early 20th century, its musical structure was formalised by Filipino composers such as Francisco Santiago and Nicanor Abelardo; they sought poetry for their lyrics, blending verse and music in equal parts.

Structure 
The formalized art song structure of the kundiman is characterized by moderate 3/4 time, with the piece beginning in a minor key and ending in the parallel major.

Origins and history 
Dr. Francisco Santiago (1889–1947), the "Father of the Kundiman Art Song", briefly explains in his scholarly work The Development of Music in the Philippines that the reason this Tagalog song is called kundiman is because the first stanza of this song begins thus:

"Cundiman, cundiman
Cundiman si jele"

"Hele ng Cundiman
Hele ng Cundangan"

In 1872, the illustrious Franciscan Tagalist and poet, Joaquín de Coria wrote Nueva Gramática Tagalog Teorica-Práctica which, besides treating grammar, also enumerates the characteristics of Tagalog language, and discusses Tagalog poetry. In this book, Coria also listed the names of the most important songs of the Tagalogs. They are: 
  Diona and Talingdao (songs in the homes and in ordinary work)
  Indolanin and Dolayin (songs in the streets)
  Soliranin (boat songs)
  Haloharin, Oyayi, and Hele-hele (lullabies)
  Sambotani (songs for festivals and social reunions)
  Tagumpay (songs to commemorate victory in war)
  Hiliraw and Balicungcung (sweet songs)
  Dopayinin (similar to Tagumpay; more serious and sincere)
  Kumintang (love song; also a pantomimic "dance song" - Dr. F. Santiago)
 Cundiman (love song; used especially in serenading)

The Spanish scholar V.M. Avella described the kundiman in his 1874 work Manual de la Conversación Familiar Español-Tagalog as the "canción indígena" (native song) of the Tagalogs and characterized its melody as "something pathetic but not without some pleasant feeling."

In his 1883 book Cuentos Filipinos, Don José Montero y Vidal recorded in Spanish the sad lyrics of what he describes as a popular kundiman of the Tagalogs:

Cundiman, cundiman
Cundiman si jele
Mas que esta dormido
Ta sona con ele.

Desde que vos cara
Yo ta mira
Aquel morisqueta
No puede traga.

Cundiman, cundiman
Cundiman, cundaman
Mamatay, me muero
Sacamay mo lamang.

The Spanish writer and historian Wenceslao E. Retana recorded in 1888 the lyrics of a popular kundiman in Batangas. The melancholic lyrics in the Tagalog original as recorded in Retana's  book El Indio Batangueño reads:
 
Aco man ay imbi, hamac isang ducha
Nasinta sa iyo, naghahasic nga
Di ba guin si David ng una ay aba
Pastor ay nag harin ng datnan ng awa?

Estrebillo:

Hele ng Cundiman
Hele ng Cundangan
Mundo palibhasai, talinghaga lamang
Ang mababa ngayon bucas ay marangal.

Sa lahat ng hirap sintang dala-dala
Salang cumilos isip coi icao na
Acoi mananaog na hahanapin quita

Estrebillo:

Hele ng Cundiman
Hele ng Cundangan
Cundangan nga icao ang may casalanan
Tataghoy-taghoy ni 'di mo pa paquingan.

In 1916, Dr. Juan V. Pagaspas, a doctor of philosophy from Indiana University and a much beloved educator in Tanauan, Batangas described the kundiman as "a pure Tagalog song which is usually very sentimental, so sentimental that if one should listen to it carefully watching the tenor of words and the way the voice is conducted to express the real meaning of the verses, he cannot but be conquered by a feeling of pity even so far as to shed tears."

Dr. Francisco Santiago, the "Father of Filipino Musical Nationalism", declared in 1931 that the kundiman "is the love song par excellence of the Filipinos, the plaintive song which goes deepest into their hearts, song which brings them untold emotions."

Endowed with such power, the kundiman naturally came to serve as a vehicle for veiled patriotism in times of colonial oppression, in which the undying love for a woman symbolized the love of country and desire for freedom.

José Rizal, leader of the Propaganda movement and the Philippine national hero, has consecrated the kundiman in his social novel Noli Me Tangere. Not only this but he himself wrote a kundiman which is not of the elegiac type because its rhythm sounds the threat, the reproach and the revindication of the rights of the race.

Kundiman ni Rizal

Tunay ngayong umid yaring diwa at puso
Ang bayan palibhasa'y api, lupig at sumuko.
Sa kapabayaan ng nagturong puno
Paglaya'y nawala, ligaya'y naglaho!

Datapuwa't muling sisikat ang maligayang araw
Pilit na maliligtas ang inaping bayan
Magbabalik man din at laging sisikat
Ang ngalang Tagalog sa sandaigdigan!

Ibubuhos namin ang dugo'y ibabaha
Ng matubos lamang ang sa Amang Lupa!
Hanggang 'di sumapit ang panahong tadhana
Sinta ay tatahimik, tutuloy ang nasa!
Sinta ay tatahimik at tutuloy ang nasa!
O Bayan kong mahal
Sintang Filipinas!

In 1941, National Artist for Music, Antonio J. Molina introduced Jocelynang Baliwag as the Kundiman of the Revolution. The melody of "Jocelynang Baliwag" is undeniably older than the title and the lyrics.  The music sheet introduced by Molina describes the melody of "Jocelynang Baliwag" as “musica
del legítimo kundiman procedente del Campo insurrecto" ('authentic kundiman music in the revolutionary camps'). In 1905, Isabelo Florentino de los Reyes wrote the kundiman and other written pieces including "Ang Singsing ng Dalagang Marmol" dedicated to Josefa 'Pepita' Tiongson y Lara from Baliwag, Bulacan whom he courted. "Jocelynang Baliuag" is actually composed of four musical pieces - "Liwayway", "El Anillo de Dalaga de Marmol", "Pepita" and Jocelynang Baliuag".

Jocelynang Baliwag

P- Pinopoong sinta, niring calolowa
Nacacawangis mo'y mabangong sampaga
Dalisay sa linis, dakila sa ganda
Matimyas na bucal ng madlang ligaya.

E- Edeng maligayang kinaloclocan
Ng galak at tuwang catamis-tamisan
Hada cang maningning na ang matunghaya'y
Masamyong bulaclac agad sumisical.

P- Pinananaligan niring aking dibdib
Na sa paglalayag sa dagat ng sakit
'Di mo babayaang malunod sa hapis
Sa pagcabagabag co'y icaw ang sasagip.

I- Icaw na nga ang lunas sa aking dalita
Tanging magliligtas sa niluha-luha
Bunying binibining sinucuang cusa
Niring catawohang nangayupapa.

T- Tanggapin ang aking wagas na pag-ibig
Marubdob na ningas na taglay sa dibdib
Sa buhay na ito'y walang nilalangit
Cung hindi ikaw lamang, ilaw niring isip.

A- At sa cawacasa'y ang kapamanhikan
Tumbasan mo yaring pagsintang dalisay
Alalahanin mong cung 'di cahabagan
Iyong lalasunin ang aba cong buhay.

The Filipino composer, conductor and scholar Felipe M. de León Jr., wrote that the kundiman is a "unique musical form expressing intense longing, caring, devotion and oneness with a beloved. Or with a child, spiritual figure, motherland, ideal or cause. According to its text, a kundiman can be romantic, patriotic, religious, mournful. Or a consolation, a lullaby. Or a protest and other types. But of whatever type, its music is soulful and lofty, conveying deep feelings of devotional love."

Notable kundiman singers
 Ruben Tagalog (1922-1985) (dubbed as the "King of Kundiman")
 Ric Manrique Jr. (1941-2017)
 Larry Miranda
 Danilo Santos
 Cenon Lagman (1936-2013)
 Armando Ramos
 Rudy Concepción (1915-1940)
 Sylvia La Torre (1933-2022) (dubbed as the "Queen of Kundiman")
 Conching Rosal (1926-1985)
 Dely Magpayo (1920-2008)
 Cely Bautista (1939-2018)
 Carmen Camacho (b. 1939)
 Rosario Moreno
 Mabuhay Singers
 Diomedes Maturan (1941-2002)
 Eva Vivar
 Rhodora Silva

See also
"Dahil sa Iyo"

References

External links 
"Tagalog Literature; A Historico-Critical Study" by Prof. Eufronio Melo Alip, Manila: U. S. T. Press, 1930. pp. 17,65
"Kundiman" by Dr. José Rizal (English version)
"The Music and Theater of the Filipino People" by R.C. Banas, from El Filipino: Revista mensual Vol I No. 9 (1926)
"The Filipino Folk Song" by Percy Hill from the Philippine magazine, Vol. XXIII, no. 3, Philippine Education Co. Manila, 1926, p. 147
"El Indio Batangueno" by Wenceslao E. Retana, Manila, Tipo-Litografia de Chofre y Cia, 1888. p. 25
"Cuentos Filipinos" by Don José Montero y Vidal, Madrid, Tip. del Asilo de Huérfanos del Sagrado Corazon de Jesús, 1883. p. 106
"Condiman: Tagalian Merriness" by Karl Scherzer from "Circumnavigation of the Globe by the Austrian Frigate Novara in the Years 1857, 1858 & 1859."
"Manual de la conversación Familiar Español-Tagalog by V.M. de Avella,Manila, C. Miralles, 1874. p. 116
"Classical Philippines Radio" plays a unique blend of classical guitar, kundiman and harana music.

Philippine styles of music